is a Japanese professional footballer who plays as a centre-back or a left-back for Bundesliga club VfB Stuttgart and the Japan national team.

Club career
After growing through Júbilo Iwata youth ranks, Hiroki Ito was promoted to the first team in 2018. He debuted as a pro in March 2018 in J. League Cup, finding his first cap in J1 League in August 2018.

On 20 May 2022, VfB Stuttgart exercised a purchase option which tied Ito to the club with a contract until June 2025.

International career
Ito made his debut for the senior Japan national team on 2 June 2022, during a 4–1 friendly win over Paraguay.

Career statistics

Club

Honours
Japan
AFC U-19 Championship third place: 2018

Individual
Bundesliga Rookie of the Month: November 2021

References

External links

 Hiroki Ito at j-league.or.jp 
 Hiroki Ito at jleague.jp (archived) 
 Hiroki Ito at Júbilo Iwata 
 Hiroki Ito at JFA
 

1999 births
Living people
Association football people from Shizuoka Prefecture
Japanese footballers
Association football defenders
Japan under-20 international footballers
Japan youth international footballers
2022 FIFA World Cup players
J1 League players
J2 League players
Bundesliga players
Júbilo Iwata players
Nagoya Grampus players
VfB Stuttgart players
Japanese expatriate footballers
Japanese expatriate sportspeople in Germany
Expatriate footballers in Germany